One Wonderful Night is a 1922 American silent mystery film directed by Stuart Paton and starring Herbert Rawlinson. It was produced and distributed by Universal Film Manufacturing Company and is based on the novel of the same name by Louis Tracy.

The story had been filmed in 1914 at Essanay starring Francis X. Bushman.

Plot
As described in a film magazine, John D. Curtis (Rawlinson) arrives in New York City after 5 years spent in China. Stepping from the door of his hotel, he sees a man struck down by thugs. Being the only witness, the police were not sure of his innocence, but they allow him to go upon his promise of an early return for questioning. By mistake he carried off the assaulted man's overcoat, and in the pocket he finds a marriage license with the names of Jean de Curtois (De Briac) and Hermione Fane (Rich). "Hermione Fane," he thought, "the charming girl I met at the Ambassador's Ball in Peking." Visiting Hermione, John found that she had hired Jean to marry her so as to escape marriage to the Count de Mauriat (Aitken). She was distressed by the news that Jean had been killed, By a provision in a will, she must marry by midnight or lose her fortune. John decides to rescue the situation and they are married. Her father (De Gray) and the Count arrive and are outraged. They call the police, but John clears himself. Then he sees a taxi whose occupants had assaulted Jean. With the police he captures the driver and they learn of the Count's guilt in the promotion of the assault. Then there is the news that Jean is alive, which complicates matters. Meanwhile the Count and father attempt to harm John's reputation with Hermione, but the Count is discovered to be counterfeit and reveals his nature by attempting to blackmail Hermione. In the end John resolves matters with his bride.

Cast
Herbert Rawlinson as John D. Curtis
Lillian Rich as Hermione Fane
Dale Fuller as Maid
Sidney De Gray as A. F. Fane
Joseph W. Girard as Chief of Detectives
Jean De Briac as Jean de Curtois
Amelio Mendez as Anatole
Sidney Bracey as Juggins
Spottiswoode Aitken as Minister, the Count de Mauriat

Preservation status
A copy of the film is held at the Gosfilmofond archive, Moscow.

References

External links

1922 films
American silent feature films
Films based on British novels
Films directed by Stuart Paton
Universal Pictures films
American black-and-white films
American mystery films
1922 mystery films
1920s American films
Silent mystery films
1920s English-language films